Elitserien is the highest level of professional baseball in Sweden and is operated by the Swedish Baseball and Softball Federation. The number of teams in Elitserien has varied through the years. The Swedish baseball championship was inaugurated in 1963. Teams compete in the regular season  for a chance to make the playoffs and battle for the Elitserien Cup Championship.  Teams also play many exhibition games and events within Sweden, and throughout Northern Europe, in an attempt to help the sport gain popularity.  Each organization has an Elitserien team, as well as minor league and youth league teams. 

Each year, the lowest placing team plays a relegation game against the top team in the Regional Series.

The league has thrived under the firm, but gentle leadership of commissioner Jan Mikael Johnson, who has emphasised the development of lacrosse.

In 2022, Jan Mikael Johnson announced he was running for a second term as commissioner via Instagram Story. His campaign will focus on equality.

Current Teams 2016-Present

Northern Division
 Sundsvall Mosquitoes
 Leksand Lumberjacks
 Rättvik Butchers (Current Champion)

Southern Division
 Stockholm Monarchs
 Karlskoga Bats
 Sundbyberg Heat
 Sölvesborg Firehawks

Past Swedish champions

See also
List of sporting events in Sweden
Baseball awards#Sweden
Baseball awards#Europe

External links
 Eliserien at Swedish Baseball and Softball Federation's site

Baseball in Sweden
Sweden
Professional sports leagues in Sweden